Derek Yee Tung-sing is a film producer, director and a former Shaw Brothers actor from Hong Kong.

Early life 
Yee was born Yee Tung-sing in Hong Kong on 28 December 1957, the son of Yee Kwong (爾光), a film producer from Tientsin (Tianjin), and Hung Wei (紅薇), an actress of half Manchu, half Mongol ethnicity. Yee's elder half-brothers Paul Chun and David Chiang as well as his elder half-sister Yim Wai were also actors.

Career 
In 1977, Yee became an actor for Shaw Brothers Studio in Hong Kong.

Yee has starred in over 40 movies in Hong Kong. This was between 1975 and 1986, during the time when Shaw Brothers Studio were still producing movies.

Yee became a screenwriter and film director. Yee is known for the 2004 film One Nite in Mongkok, which won multiple awards. Yee's other notable films include C'est la vie, mon chéri, Viva Erotica, The Truth About Jane and Sam and Protégé.

In 2017, Yee became the chairman of Hong Kong Film Awards Association.

Filmography

As director and screenwriter

As actor

See also 
 Hong Kong Film Award for Best Director

References

External links
 
 
 Hong Kong Film Awards Association
 Hong Kong Film Directors' Guild

1957 births
Living people
Hong Kong film directors
Hong Kong male film actors
Hong Kong people of Manchu descent
Hong Kong people of Mongolian descent
Hong Kong screenwriters
Manchu male actors
Members of the Election Committee of Hong Kong, 2017–2021
Shaw Brothers Studio
20th-century Hong Kong male actors
21st-century Hong Kong male actors